The first season of the American superhero streaming television series Titans premiered on DC Universe on October 12, 2018, and concluded on December 21, 2018, consisting of 11 episodes. It was executive produced by Akiva Goldsman, Geoff Johns, Greg Berlanti, Sarah Schechter, and Greg Walker, with Walker serving as showrunner. Created by Goldsman, Johns, and Berlanti, the series is based on the DC Comics team Teen Titans. Featured in the main cast are Brenton Thwaites, Anna Diop, Teagan Croft, and Ryan Potter. The season also introduces Alan Ritchson, Minka Kelly, Curran Walters, and Conor Leslie, who would join the main cast in the following season. The first season marks the live-action debut of the Teen Titans, as well as the launch of DC Universe's original scripted programming.

In the first season, vigilante Dick Grayson (Thwaites) leaves Gotham City for Detroit in an effort to distance himself from his mentor Bruce Wayne. When the mysterious Rachel Roth (Croft) comes to Dick for protection from dangerous forces pursuing her, Dick finds himself thrust into action as he struggles to distance himself from his Robin persona and control his violent urges. Joined by Kory Anders (Diop), an amnesiac woman with solar-based powers, and Gar Logan (Potter), an animal shapeshifter, the four battle a threat that puts the entire world at risk.

Development of a live-action series based on Teen Titans began in 2014 when the project was picked up by TNT. A pilot written by Goldsman and Marc Haimes was ordered, but never filmed, and TNT passed on the project in 2016. The following year, Warner Bros. announced that the project would move forward in 2018 as the first scripted series for DC Universe. Initially planned to comprise 12 episodes, the original finale would be removed and the intended penultimate episode became the season finale. The season's story was primarily inspired by Marv Wolfman and George Pérez's The New Teen Titans comics from the 1980s.

The season received generally positive reviews, with praise for the story, characters, and performances. Criticism was directed towards the violent tone and the finale's cliffhanger ending. The second season, which was announced ahead of the first season's premiere, would use the original finale as the basis for its premiere episode.

In addition to being the first live-action adaptation of the Teen Titans, the season serves as the live-action introduction for the DC Comics team Doom Patrol, who appear in the self-titled fourth episode. The characters introduced would later be featured in an eponymous series on DC Universe, with April Bowlby, Matt Bomer, and Brendan Fraser reprising their roles as Rita Farr, Larry Trainor, and Cliff Steele, although it occupies a separate continuity from Titans.

Episodes

Cast and characters

Main
 Brenton Thwaites as Dick Grayson / Robin: The former vigilante sidekick of Batman, now a police detective estranged from his mentor
 Tomaso Sanelli as young Dick Grayson
 Anna Diop as Koriand'r / Kory Anders: An amnesiac extraterrestrial from the planet Tamaran with the ability to absorb and redirect solar energy
 Teagan Croft as Rachel Roth: An empath born to a demon father and human mother
 Ryan Potter as Gar Logan: A shapeshifter formerly with the Doom Patrol who developed the ability to transform into a tiger

Recurring
 Reed Birney as Dr. Adamson: A high-ranking member of Trigon's organization
 Alan Ritchson as Hank Hall / Hawk: The aggressive half of a vigilante duo with his girlfriend Dawn, formerly partnered with his half-brother Don
 Tait Blum as young Hank Hall
 Minka Kelly as Dawn Granger / Dove: A vigilante who serves as a tactical counterpart to her partner and boyfriend Hank
 Curran Walters as Jason Todd / Robin: Batman's current vigilante sidekick, taking on the role of Robin after Dick's departure
 Rachel Nichols as Angela Azarath: Rachel's biological mother, secretly in allegiance with Trigon
 Melody Johnson as Nuclear Mom: The matriarch of the Nuclear Family
 Jeni Ross as Nuclear Sis: The daughter/sister figure of the Nuclear Family
 Logan Thompson as Nuclear Biff: The son/brother figure of the Nuclear Family

Guest

 Lindsey Gort as Amy Rohrbach: A Detroit police detective partnered with Dick Grayson
 Conor Leslie as Donna Troy: An adopted member of the Amazons who was Wonder Woman's sidekick Wonder Girl before pursuing a career as an investigative photojournalist
 Andi Hubick as young Donna Troy
 Seamus Dever as Trigon: An interdimensional demon with the power to destroy worlds and Rachel's father. Dever also portrays Frank Finney, a Gotham City police captain in an illusion created by Trigon.
 Jarreth Merz as the Acolyte: A mysterious man hunting Rachel
 Liza Colón-Zayas as Jessica Perez: A detective in the Detroit Police Department
 Sherilyn Fenn as Melissa Roth: Rachel's adoptive mother
 Meagen Fay as Sister Catherine: The head of a convent that Rachel resided in as a child
 Cara Ricketts as Becky Bond: A social worker who managed Bruce's adoption of Dick
 April Bowlby as Rita Farr: A member of the Doom Patrol and former actress, whose cellular structure became unstable after being exposed to a toxic gas
 Bruno Bichir as Niles Caulder / The Chief: The leader of the Doom Patrol and medical scientist, responsible for saving the lives of its members and giving them residence in his mansion
 Jake Michaels and Brendan Fraser as Clifford "Cliff" Steele: A member of the Doom Patrol and former stock car racer, whose brain was transplanted into a robotic body after an accident destroyed his own. Michaels physically portrays Cliff while Fraser voices the character and appears as him in photos.
 Dwain Murphy and Matt Bomer as Larry Trainor: A member of the Doom Patrol and former United States Air Force pilot wrapped entirely in bandages after being exposed to negative energy. Murphy physically portrays Larry while Bomer provides the voice of the character and appears as him in photos.
 Hina Adbullah as Shyleen Lao: A young woman who develops the ability to control temperature from being covered in liquid nitrogen
 Lester Speight as Clayton Williams: A nightclub security guard who was previously a strongman at Haly's Circus and Dick's caretaker before Bruce adopted Dick
 Kyle Mac as Nick Zucco: Tony Zucco's vengeful son
 Rachael Crawford as the asylum doctor: The head of Agnews Asylum
 Elliot Knight as Don Hall / Dove: Hank's original partner and younger half-brother
 Jayden Marine as young Don Hall
 Marina Sirtis as Marie Granger: Dawn's mother
 Trevor Hayes as Vincent: A child molester who was Hank's football coach
 Jeff Roop as Thomas Carson: Angela's former high school classmate, now the sheriff of their hometown
 Randolf Hobbs and April Brown Chodkowski as John and Mary Grayson: A pair of trapeze artists at Haly's Circus and Dick's parents
 Mark Antony Krupa as Konstantin Kovar: A gangster in Vienna, Austria
 Jeff Clarke as Nuclear Dad: The patriarch of the Nuclear Family
 Zach Smadu as Nuclear Stepdad: Nuclear Dad's successor in the Nuclear Family
 Richard Zeppieri as Tony Zucco: The gangster responsible for the deaths of Dick's parents
 Damian Walshe-Howling as Graham Norris: An international poacher and contact of Donna
 James Scallion as Johnny "John" Grayson: Dick and Dawn's son in an illusion created by Trigon

Body double Brooker Muir portrays Subject 13 in a post-credit scene. Stuntmen Alain Moussi and Maxime Savaria make uncredited appearances as Batman, while an uncredited actor portrays the character's alter-ego Bruce Wayne. An uncredited actor provides the voice of Alfred Pennyworth. Maisie Williams and Rory McCann appear in archive footage from the Game of Thrones episode "First of His Name" as Arya Stark and Sandor Clegane.

Production

Development

A potential live-action Titans project for cable channel TNT was announced in September 2014. By December 2014, a pilot written by Akiva Goldsman and Marc Haimes had been ordered that would feature Dick Grayson emerging from Batman's shadow to become Nightwing, the leader of a band of heroes including Starfire, Raven, Oracle, and Hawk and Dove. The pilot was set with filming to occur in Toronto in the mid-2015. In May 2015, TNT president Kevin Reilly said that they hoped to have the casting locked down by the start of filming and that the show would be "very true" to the comics and "groundbreaking". The series, called Titans and then Blackbirds, was first set to begin shooting in Toronto in mid-2015. Production was then postponed to October. In January 2016, it was announced that TNT would no longer be moving forward with the project. In February 2016, DC Chief Creative Officer Geoff Johns stated, "We [at DC] have known about [TNT nixing Titans] for months and months and months. That's not new news to us. We have plans for Titans. It's a huge piece of DC and we have plans."

In April 2017, Warner Bros. announced that Titans would debut in 2018 on DC Comics' own direct-to-consumer digital service. The series was created by Goldsman, Johns, and Greg Berlanti, who wrote the pilot episode. Showrunner duties were given to Greg Walker. Goldsman, Johns, Berlanti, Walker, and Sarah Schechter are also executive producers of the series through Goldsman's Weed Road Pictures and Berlanti's Berlanti Productions, in association with Warner Bros. Television.

Though 12 episodes were initially announced, the 12th episode was removed and the 11th episode became the season 1 finale. The intended 12th episode served as the basis for the season 2 premiere.

Writing
Johns said the series was inspired mostly by the Teen Titans comics of the 1980s, since that comic's run "had so much drama" and "was so revolutionary for its time". He added, "We really wanted to lean into the idea that every Titan of these Titans is a doorway into another genre. With Rachel [a.k.a. Raven], it's the supernatural and the horror, and the first season really focuses on who Raven is and how the Titans galvanize around her." Johns also felt the series would be "a little more adult" than the television series Riverdale, calling it "not necessarily a teen drama, [but] more of an adventure piece". He said that tonally, "We wanted to do something different from everything else out there. We wanted to arrive at a tone that wasn't as welcoming as some of the DC shows have been, nor as nihilistic as some of the films have been." Goldsman said that as the series continues, it will ask "How are these broken people going to cohere? Or will they?" Johns noted that Robin's controversial "Fuck Batman" line in the pilot was a late addition to the script. Dick's actor Brenton Thwaites said of the line, "I thought it was perfect... This is not a show about Batman. It's a show about Dick."

Casting
In early August 2017, Teagan Croft was cast as Rachel Roth, followed by the casting of Anna Diop as Kory Anders and Brenton Thwaites as Dick Grayson the same month. Ahead of the series premiere, Diop reduced her presence on social media because of racist attacks towards her casting. The main cast for the first season would be rounded out by Ryan Potter as Gar Logan, who was announced in October 2017.

In early September 2017, Alan Ritchson and Minka Kelly were cast in the recurring roles of Hank Hall and Dawn Granger, respectively. By the end of the month, Lindsey Gort had been cast as original character Amy Rohrbach. In January 2018, Seamus Dever was cast in an undisclosed role that was later revealed to be Trigon. The following month, members of the Doom Patrol were announced with Bruno Bichir as the Chief, April Bowlby as Rita Farr, Jake Michaels as Cliff Steel, and Dwain Murphy as Larry Trainor. In August, Elliot Knight was cast as Don Hall. Additionally, Curran Walters and Conor Leslie appear as Jason Todd and Donna Troy, respectively.

Filming
Filming for began on November 15, 2017, in Toronto, Ontario, and concluded June 28, 2018.

Reception 

On Rotten Tomatoes, the first season holds a "Certified Fresh" approval rating of 78%, with an average rating of 6.66 out of 10 based on 46 reviews. The site's critical consensus states, "Despite a few tonal growing pains, Titans does justice to its source material and truly shines when its titular ensemble finally assembles." Metacritic gave the series' first season a score of 55 out of 100 based on eight critics, indicating "mixed or average reviews".

Susana Polo of Polygon praised Titans for "tempering brutal violence and dark subject matter with humor—and by giving its characters plenty of time to stretch, breathe and become attached to one another". Describing Anna Diop's performance of Kory Anders as the strongest aspect of the first three episodes, Charlie Ridgely of Comicbook.com wrote that "she conveys so much wonder and intrigue with her subtle and genuine expressions, but there is a consistent fierceness and tenacity that is always lurking just beneath the surface." Rosie Knight of Nerdist wrote that the "cast is at the core of what makes Titans so enjoyable", while giving praise to the script as well.

Forbes contributor Merrill Barr compared the show to The CW's Riverdale, describing it as "a dark and gritty series very far removed from the image the Teen Titans have garnered through a variety of animated outings over the last decade". Barr found that viewers "that take the tone in stride are going to find themselves in the middle of a series dialed directly into their interests". Rob Salkowitz of Forbes wrote that Titans "somehow managed to deliver on the dark-and-foreboding tone that the early DC movies so conspicuously got wrong".

Kevin Yeoman of Screen Rant was critical of the show's excessive violence, writing that Titans "doesn't put forward any new or particularly compelling thoughts about its characters or about superheroes in general". Similarly, Vinne Mancuso of Collider said, "If you're just a fan of some good old-fashioned ultra-violence and moody storytelling, this simply isn't a well-done example of that".

Evening Standard reviewer Guy Pewsey stated that the series was "enjoyable and watchable" and although questioning if Brenton Thwaites could "pull off the role of leader of a group of crime-fighters" as Dick Grayson, called Diop's performance a "highlight" of Titans.

The season finale "Dick Grayson", which was originally intended as the penultimate episode, drew criticism for its cliffhanger ending and not resolving the main storyline of the season. IGN's Jesse Schedeen gave the finale a 4/10, writing that after "Titans got off to a surprisingly good start this year, especially considering all the baggage the series was carrying when it first debuted", the episode "manages to derail that momentum and goodwill with a head-scratching and extremely unsatisfying final chapter". Den of Geek's Mike Cecchini called the episode's cliffhanger "anticlimactic and feels like a cheat". Writing for Entertainment Weekly, Christian Holub said, "The journey to Nightwing is gonna take a lot longer than I thought. But I was really impressed by this season overall, and I'm excited for season 2".

References

External links 
 
 

Titans (2018 TV series) seasons
2018 American television seasons